Chiang may mean:

 a Chinese surname (蔣), alternatively spelt Jiang
 Chiang Kai-shek, former leader of the Republic of China
 Chi'ang, variant spelling of the ancient Qiang (historical people) (羌) 
 Chi'ang, variant spelling of the modern Qiang people (羌族) in Wenchuan
 Chiang, variant spelling of jiang soy sauce
 Chiang (place name), a term for "town" in Northern Thailand and surrounding areas

See also
 Chiang Dao (disambiguation)
Jiang (disambiguation)